Révolutions is  a novel  by French writer and Nobel laureate J. M. G. Le Clézio. No English translation has yet been published.

Novels by J. M. G. Le Clézio
2003 French novels
Works by J. M. G. Le Clézio
Éditions Gallimard books